Bethlehem (also known as Scott) is an unincorporated community in Harrison County, West Virginia, United States. Bethlehem is located on County Route 12 along the eastern border of Shinnston.

References

Unincorporated communities in Harrison County, West Virginia
Unincorporated communities in West Virginia